Hopewell may refer to:

Places

Barbados 
Hopewell, Christ Church
Hopewell, Saint Thomas

Canada
 Hopewell Parish, New Brunswick
 Hopewell Cape, New Brunswick
 Hopewell Rocks, a tourist attraction new Hopewell Cape
 Hopewell, Newfoundland and Labrador
 Hopewell, Nova Scotia

Jamaica 
Hopewell, Clarendon
Hopewell, Hanover
Hopewell, Manchester
Hopewell, Saint Andrew
Hopewell, Saint Ann
Hopewell, Saint Elizabeth
Hopewell, Westmoreland

South Africa 
Hopewell, KwaZulu-Natal

United States

Alabama 
Hopeful, Alabama, formerly Hopewell
Hopewell, Blount County, Alabama
Hopewell, Cherokee County, Alabama
Hopewell, Cleburne County, Alabama
Hopewell, DeKalb County, Alabama
Hopewell, Jefferson County, Alabama
Hopewell, Lee County, Alabama
McCord Crossroads, Alabama, formerly Hopewell
West Greene, Alabama, formerly Hopewell

Arkansas 
Hopewell, Baxter County, Arkansas
Hopewell, Boone County, Arkansas
Hopewell, Cleburne County, Arkansas
Hopewell, Greene County, Arkansas
Hopewell, Lawrence County, Arkansas
Hopewell, Pike County, Arkansas

Connecticut 
Hopewell, Fairfield County, Connecticut
Hopewell, Hartford County, Connecticut

Florida 
Hopewell, Hillsborough County, Florida
Hopewell, Madison County, Florida

Georgia 
Ceres, Georgia, formerly Hopewell
Hopewell, Camden County, Georgia
Hopewell, Fulton County, Georgia
Hopewell, Harris County, Georgia

Illinois 
Hopewell, Illinois

Indiana 
Hopewell, DeKalb County, Indiana
Hopewell, Johnson County, Indiana

Iowa 
Hopewell, Iowa

Kansas 
Hopewell, Pratt County, Kansas
Hopewell, Washington County, Kansas

Kentucky 
 Hopewell, Greenup County, Kentucky
 Hopewell, Laurel County, Kentucky
 Hopewell, Louisville, a community in Louisville

Maryland 
 Hopewell, Howard County, Maryland
 Hopewell, St. Mary's County, Maryland
 Hopewell, Somerset County, Maryland
 Hopewell (Providence, Maryland), a historic house
 Hopewell (Union Bridge, Maryland)
 Spencers Wharf, Maryland, formerly Hopewell

Mississippi 
Hopewell, Benton County, Mississippi
Hopewell, Calhoun County, Mississippi
Hopewell, Clay County, Mississippi
Hopewell, Copiah County, Mississippi
Hopewell, Covington County, Mississippi
Hopewell, Marion County, Mississippi
Warrenton, Mississippi, formerly Hopewell

Missouri 
Hopewell, Daviess County, Missouri
Hopewell, Mississippi County, Missouri
Hopewell, Warren County, Missouri
Hopewell, Washington County, Missouri

New Jersey 
 Hopewell, New Jersey, in Mercer County
 Hopewell, Sussex County, New Jersey
 Hopewell Township, New Jersey (disambiguation)

New Mexico 
Hopewell, New Mexico

New York 
Hopewell, New York

North Carolina 
Hopewell, Mecklenburg County, North Carolina
Hopewell, Rutherford County, North Carolina
Hopewell, Wayne County, North Carolina

Ohio 
Hopewell, Jefferson County, Ohio
Hopewell, Muskingum County, Ohio
Hopewell, Seneca County, Ohio
Hopewell Heights, Ohio, also known as Hopewell

Oklahoma 
Hopewell, Oklahoma

Oregon 
Hopewell, Oregon

Pennsylvania 
 Hopewell, Bedford County, Pennsylvania
 Hopewell, Chester County, Pennsylvania
 Hopewell (on Hammer Creek), Lancaster County
 Hopewell, Westmoreland County, Pennsylvania

South Carolina 
Hopewell, Williamsburg County, South Carolina, which is partially in Georgetown County
Hopewell, York County, South Carolina

Tennessee 
Hopewell, Bradley County, Tennessee
Hopewell, Cannon County, Tennessee
Hopewell, Carroll County, Tennessee
Hopewell, Claiborne County, Tennessee
Hopewell, Davidson County, Tennessee
Hopewell, Decatur County, Tennessee
Hopewell, Gibson County, Tennessee
Hopewell, Maury County, Tennessee
Hopewell, Tipton County, Tennessee

Texas 
Hopewell, Franklin County, Texas
Hopewell, Houston County, Texas
Hopewell, Lamar County, Texas
Hopewell, Leon County, Texas
Hopewell, Red River County, Texas

Virginia 
 Hopewell, Virginia, an independent city formerly part of Prince George County
 Hopewell, Fauquier County, Virginia
 Hopewell, Pittsylvania County, Virginia
 Hopewell, Bourbon County, now Paris, Kentucky

West Virginia 
Hopewell, Barbour County, West Virginia
Hopewell, Fayette County, West Virginia
Hopewell, Marion County, West Virginia
Hopewell, Preston County, West Virginia
Hopewell (Millville, West Virginia)

Other uses
Hopewell (surname), for people with this name
Hopewell (band), an American rock band
Hopewell Holdings, Hong Kong listed company
Hopewell pottery
Hopewell tradition, a Native American material culture
The Hopewell Project, a solar power project
Bangkok Elevated Road and Train System, commonly known as the Hopewell Project, an infrastructure construction project
Hopewell, the plantation of Andrew Pickens in northwest South Carolina
Treaty of Hopewell, three treaties between the U.S. and Native Americans signed at the South Carolina plantation
USS Hopewell, two ships of the US Navy

See also
 Hopewell Academy (Hopewell, New Jersey)
 Hopewell Academy, in North Carolina
 Hopewell Area School District, in Pennsylvania
 Hopewell Center (disambiguation)
 Hopewell Culture National Historical Park in Ohio
 Hopewell Gardens, Florida
 Hopewell Hall, Saint Thomas, Jamaica
 Hopewell High School (disambiguation)
 Hopewell Landing, Mississippi
 Hopewell Mill, Tennessee
 Hopewell Presbyterian Church (disambiguation)
 Hopewell School (disambiguation)
 Hopewell Springs, Tennessee
 Hopewell Township (disambiguation)
 Hopewell Village, Maryland